Steve Cooper is a male retired British wrestler.

Wrestling career
Cooper represented England and won a bronze medal in the 68 kg lightweight division, at the 1986 Commonwealth Games in Edinburgh, Scotland.

References

Living people
British male sport wrestlers
Wrestlers at the 1986 Commonwealth Games
Commonwealth Games bronze medallists for England
Year of birth missing (living people)
Commonwealth Games medallists in wrestling
Medallists at the 1986 Commonwealth Games